The 1962 All-Big Eight Conference football team consists of American football players chosen by various organizations for All-Big Eight Conference teams for the 1962 NCAA University Division football season.  The selectors for the 1962 season included the Associated Press (AP) and the United Press International (UPI).  Players selected as first-team players by both the AP and UPI are designated in bold.

All-Big Eight selections

Backs
 Dave Hoppmann, Iowa State (AP-1; UPI-1)
 Gale Sayers, Kansas (AP-1; UPI-1)
 Johnny Roland, Missouri (AP-1)
 Jim Grisham, Oklahoma (AP-1)
 Joe Don Looney, Oklahoma (UPI-1)
 Dennis Claridge, Nebraska (UPI-1)

Ends
 Conrad Hitchler, Missouri (AP-1; UPI-1)
 Ken Blair, Colorado (AP-1; UPI-1)

Tackles
 Dennis Ward, Oklahoma (AP-1; UPI-1)
 Tyrone Robertson, Nebraska (AP-1)
 Jerry Wallach, Missouri (UPI-1)

Guards
 Leon Cross, Oklahoma (AP-1; UPI-1)
 Tom Hertz, Missouri (AP-1; UPI-1)

Centers
 Wayne Lee, Oklahoma (AP-1; UPI-1)

Key
AP = Associated Press

UPI = United Press International

See also
 1962 College Football All-America Team

References

All-Big Seven Conference football team
All-Big Eight Conference football teams